The 2011–12 Serie A season was the 78th season of the Serie A, the top level of ice hockey in Italy. 10 teams participated in the league, and HC Bolzano won the championship by defeating HC Pustertal in the final.

First round

Second round

Group A

Group B

Playoffs

External links
 Lega Italiana Hockey Ghiaccio website

Serie A
Serie A (ice hockey) seasons
Ita